Mustafa Ružnić (born 25 May 1980) is a Bosnian politician who is the current Prime Minister of Una-Sana Canton. He is a member of the political party (NES).

Ružnić studied in Cazin, then graduated in criminology at the University of Sarajevo. In 2016, he obtained a master's degree at the University of Banja Luka. He worked at the Una-Sana Canton employment agency.

Right after the 2018 general election, on 17 October 2018, the outgoing cantonal assembly removed the Government of Husein Rošić (SDA), and Ružnić was appointed Prime Minister of the canton for a governing coalition which includes A-SDA, SDP BiH, DF, NB and DNZ.

In June 2020, Ružnić's adviser Mirsad Topčagić was arrested by the State Investigation and Protection Agency (SIPA). In March 2021, Ružnić was criticised for receiving MPs from the far-right AfD party, which had just been put under surveillance by the German secret services.

References

External links 
 cazin.ba, Mustafa Ružnić
 avaz.ba, Mustafa Ružnić

1980 births
Living people
People from Cazin
Bosniaks of Bosnia and Herzegovina
Bosnia and Herzegovina Muslims
Bosniak politicians